The Sol is a river in Perm Krai and Komi Republic, Russia, a left tributary of the Chyornaya, which in turn is a tributary of the Veslyana.

References 

Rivers of Perm Krai
Rivers of the Komi Republic